The Brezno train accident was a train accident which occurred close to Brezno, Slovakia, on 21 February 2009, when a train collided with a tourist coach on a level crossing. Twelve people were killed and at least twenty people were injured in the crash. All of the deaths and injuries occurred on the bus, which was pushed for tens of metres by the derailed train. The crash scene is near the popular ski resort of Polomka Bucnik, where the tourists were headed. The crash led to the third national day of mourning in Slovakia's history.

Accident details 
The accident occurred on a level crossing near Brezno at approximately 09:00 local time (08:00 UTC), according to the Slovak news agency TASR. Officials say the coach was travelling to the nearby ski resort. Thirty-six people were on the coach – all were from Bánovce nad Bebravou in western Slovakia. Martina Pavlikova, of Slovak Railways said: "All the dead and injured were on the bus. There were only a few passengers on the train and they didn't suffer any serious injuries". The train collided with the coach at full speed on a level-crossing near Polomka Bucnik. The railway crossing only had a stop sign; there were no light signals and barriers to prevent vehicles from crossing. Several of the injured are in serious condition. Two people who sustained spinal injuries had to be airlifted to a hospital in Banská Bystrica, and the rest were hospitalized in Brezno.

See also 
 2009 Orissa train derailment
 List of level crossing accidents
 List of rail accidents (2000–present)

References

External links 
 Slovakia profile at the BBC

2009 in Slovakia
2009 road incidents
Railway accidents in 2009
Bus incidents in Slovakia
Level crossing incidents in Slovakia
February 2009 events in Europe
2009 disasters in Slovakia